Frank Goode (born 19 December 1939) is a former Australian rules footballer who played for North Melbourne in the VFL during the 1960s.

Owing to an injury to John Dugdale, Goode spent the 1965 and 1966 seasons as a full-forward with success. He topped North Melbourne's goal kicking in those years with 38 and 49 goals respectively. Injured earl 1967 he had surgery-injured again in 1968 and when second surgery failed he went on to coach NMFC U19's after which he coached Sandringham VFA side in 1971/72.  He later became assistant coach at Footscray and in 1981 stepped in for senior coach Royce Hart in a game against Melbourne, which they lost. After coaching joined AFL Tribunal for 5 years.

References

Holmesby, Russell and Main, Jim (2007). The Encyclopedia of AFL Footballers. 7th ed. Melbourne: Bas Publishing.

1939 births
Australian rules footballers from Victoria (Australia)
North Melbourne Football Club players
Western Bulldogs coaches
Moe Football Club players
Living people